Unikitty! (stylized as UniKitty!) is an American animated television series developed by Ed Skudder and Lynn Wang for Cartoon Network and produced by The Lego Group and Warner Bros. Animation. The series stars the character of the same name from The Lego Movie franchise.

The series was announced on May 10, 2017. At the 2017 San Diego Comic-Con, it was confirmed by co-showrunner and co-executive producer Ed Skudder that the series would premiere on Cartoon Network on January 1, 2018. The second season of the series premiered on February 4, 2019, while the third and final season premiered on December 24, 2019.

The series ended on August 27, 2020, with the two-part series finale "The Birthday to End All Birthdays". By this point, Warner Bros. had terminated their film deal with Lego, resulting in Lego moving on to work with Universal Pictures. Despite this, Warner Bros. still owns the rights to their run of The Lego Movie franchise. However, an episode titled "Sick Day", was left unaired in the United States due to being unintentionally similar to the COVID-19 pandemic, but aired in other territories.

Premise
As the ruler of the Unikingdom, Princess Unikitty has various misadventures in her land with her brother Prince Puppycorn, scientist Dr. Fox, bodyguard Hawkodile, and advisor Richard. They also deal with the threats of Master Frown from the neighboring Frown Town.

Characters

Main
 Princess Unikitty (voiced by Tara Strong; singing voice by Juliana Hansen) – The princess of the Unikingdom who is a cat/unicorn hybrid. She is very happy, playful, cute, and upbeat, but has an angry side that she sometimes struggles to control. She was previously voiced by Alison Brie in the original film and its sequel.
 Prince Puppycorn (voiced by Grey Griffin) — Unikitty's younger brother, a puppy/unicorn hybrid. He is sometimes clueless and dimwitted, but is also loyal and good-hearted. He makes a cameo in The LEGO Movie 2: The Second Part.
 Dr. Fox (voiced by Kate Micucci) – A red fox who is the castle's resident scientist whose experiments and inventions can both create and resolve problems. Hawkodile has a crush on her.
 Dr. Fox's Robots – Small robots that work for Dr. Fox.
 Hawkodile (voiced by Roger Craig Smith) – Unikitty's trusty hawk/crocodile hybrid bodyguard who has a "macho" personality and has a crush on Dr. Fox. He trained to be a fighter in the Action Forest and has a rival named Eagleator, who was his former best friend and an eagle/alligator hybrid.
 Richard (voiced by Roger Craig Smith) – A grey 1x3 Lego brick who is Unikitty's royal advisor and the castle's property caretaker. He speaks with a dull monotone voice and is often the voice of reason, though the others find him boring to listen to.
 Master Frown (voiced by Eric Bauza) – Unikitty's archenemy who comes from Frown Town at the other side of Unikitty's kingdom. He is one of the Doom Lords that spread pain and misery throughout the world as he wants to impress the other Doom Lords. This often causes him to suffer the wrath of Unikitty, who wants to spread fun and joy. In the series finale, Master Frown betrays the other Doom Lords and becomes friends with Unikitty and the rest of the main 5, in prior to his redemption.
 Brock (voiced by H. Michael Croner) – An anthropomorphic headstone with a neutral personality who is Master Frown's best friend since childhood, sidekick, and boyfriend (this is confirmed in the end of the series). Brock would often hang around his apartment playing video games rather than help Master Frown with his plots. The only time he gets angry is when Master Frown neglects his part of the chores. He is also Crankybeard's son.

Minor
 Asteroid - A talking asteroid who appears in the episode "Asteroid Blues".
 Action Police - A police force who first appeared in "License To Punch".
 Batty - A dark purple and black bat citizen in the Unikingdom with a stand for legs.
Beau (voiced by Tara Strong) - A blue square with  yellow stripes.
 Beatsby - A yellow boombox with tiny-rounded arms and legs and light red eye sclerae. His toy counterpart has no arms and legs.
 Bim-Bom Liebowitz (voiced by H. Michael Croner when speaking, Roger Craig Smith when coughing) - An anthropomorphic green garbage bag or dumpling who has somewhat of a sassy and sometimes antagonistic personality.
 Burger Person (voiced by Tara Strong) - A cheeseburger citizen of Unikingdom who dislikes being eaten.
 Crabatar - A robot crab created by Dr. Fox who appeared in "Beach Daze" that is used to study crabs. At the end of the episode, she and the other robot crabs trap the gang in a "pinching dungeon" to torture them with pinching and she claims the Perfect Spot.
 Craig (voiced by Tara Strong in an Italian accent) – A female moose who works as a farmer.
 Crankybeard (voiced by Eric Bauza) - A bluish-grey tombstone-shaped old man with one wheel for a left foot who resides in Frowntown. He is also Brock's father.
 Crazy Chicken – A chicken that is crafted out of a single brick.
 Candy Fighters - Six sentient candies who were brought to life by the gang in the episode "The Very Best Candy" to compete against each other for dominance over which is the best candy.
 Cupcake Monster - A mutated cupcake created by Dr. Fox from "Crushing Defeat" that was blasted by Hawkodile.
 Dainty (voiced by Grey Griffin) - A blue circular-headed citizen with rectangular arms who usually drives a car.
 Dino Dude (voiced by Grey Griffin in 2017–18, Eric Bauza in 2018 in an Australian accent) – An Australian-accented Tyrannosaurus with wheels instead of legs.
 Doom Lords - The Doom Lords are a group of villainous individuals that Master Frown is a part of that make their lair in a tall building in Frown Town. In the series finale, they were betrayed by Master Frown as he quits and are defeated by the power of friendship afterwards.
 Master Doom (voiced by Grey Griffin in a demonic voice) - Master Doom is the leader of the Doom Lords. She has a tendency to chastise Master Frown for his various failures and appears menacing to the other Doom Lords. She is distinguished by her heterochromia iridum, or odd-eyes as she has one purple iris and one cyan iris.
 Master Papercuts - Master Papercuts is a member of the Doom Lords with a paper hat. He is the butt of the jokes and claims to do a better job than Master Frown.
 Master Malice - A member of the Doom Lords with long green horns.
 Master Hazard (voiced by Roger Craig Smith) - A member of the Doom Lords with a fiery head and dark purple bat-like wings. He once burned down the Candy Corn Kingdom.
 Master Misery (voiced by Tara Strong) - A member of the Doom Lords with an olive-green diamond-shaped face and dark blue hair obscuring the eyes.
 Master Fear (voiced by Eric Bauza) - A member of the Doom Lords with a blue water drop-shaped face and hollow eye sockets.
 Master Pain (voiced by Grey Griffin) - A female member of the Doom Lords with a white noh mask-like face and pale yellow pupil-less eyes.
 Master Plague - A member of the Doom Lords with a green bird-like head and large eyes.
 Dr. Bunny - A minor character who only appears on the Everything Is Awesome Tween Dream Remix video for The LEGO Movie 2: The Second Part. She and Dr. Fox are friends.
 Eagleator (voiced by Keith Ferguson) - An eagle/alligator hybrid and Hawkodile's rival and former best friend hailing from the Action Forest who wants to defeat him and take his shades after Sensei Falcamodo rewarded him with them.
 Esteban - A character from the episode "Roadtrip Ruckus". He is a friend of Really Old Edith.
 Father Time - The master of time who appeared in "Delivery Effect".
 Feebee (voiced by Grey Griffin in a Southern accent) – A Southern-accented flower/bumblebee/ hybrid who runs "Feebee's Flower Shop." Her name is sometimes written as 'FeeBee'.
 Flamurtle (voiced by Natasha Leggero) - A flamingo/turtle hybrid with a blue mohawk hairstyle who was the main antagonist of the episode "The New Nemesis". She was Eagleator's other sworn nemesis besides Hawkodile. After being defeated by Hawkodile and Eagleator, she returns to her true arch-nemesis, Owlamander.
 Glandrea - A blue citizen whose head resembles a mountain with a flag on top.
 Gluppycorn - A minor character from "The Unikingdom Awards" who resembles Puppycorn with Unikitty's color scheme. He was seen crying while Schmunikitty consoles him after losing an award.
 Herbert Sherbert - An ice cream cone who works sells ice cream out of a pushcart. He also has a wife named Toni Spumoni-Sherbert.
 Hominid – A green genderless alien that moves around in a UFO.
 Kickflip (voiced by Tara Strong in most episodes, Grey Griffin in "Little Prince Puppycorn") – A pink skateboard-riding square.
 M'Ladybug (voiced by Tara Strong) – A ladybug with a purple shell.
 Owlamander (voiced by Grey Griffin) - A character from "The New Nemesis". She is an owl/salamander hybrid. She is the true arch-nemesis of Flamurtle.
 Old Timey Mustache Man (voiced by Eric Bauza) - A green old man citizen who likes bouncy houses.
 Q.T. (voiced by Tara Strong) - A pink oval-headed humanoid citizen of the Unikingdom with a magenta bow on her head.
 Really Old Edith (voiced by Grey Griffin) - A blue-hunched-over figure who is one of the oldest citizens of the Unikingdom.
 Rock Guy - A seemingly inanimate rock that is Puppycorn's friend.
 Ryott (voiced by Roger Craig Smith) – A green square man who screams instead of speaking.
 Schmunikitty - A character from "The Unikingdom Awards" that resembles Unikitty with Puppycorn's color scheme. She consoles Gluppycorn, who was crying over losing an award.
 Stellacopter – A purple creature with round hands that wears a fez that has a helicopter-like blade on it.
 Stocko (voiced by Kate Micucci) - A teal rectangle with arms and a bowler hat.
 Score Creeper (voiced by Roger Craig Smith) - A creepy Grim Reaper-like spirit villain who usually traps Unikitty and her friends in games such as "Spoooooky Game". He also tends to speak in rhyme.
 Tap-Dancing Butterfly (voiced by Grey Griffin) - A butterfly that likes to entertain an audience with her tap dancing. 
 Ted Butter (vocal effects provided by Roger Craig Smith) - A green duck-like citizen with a vertical rectangle head and vertically stacked eyes and an antagonistic personality.
 The Tooth Fairy (voiced by Grey Griffin in a Bronx accent) - A fairy who collects teeth. She appears in "Tooth Trouble" and the end of the same episode, she punishes the gang for stealing teeth by taking theirs.
 Theodore (voiced by Roger Craig Smith) - A brown bear with a smooth voice, a square head, long arms, and short legs.
 Toaster and Toast (voiced by Roger Craig Smith and H. Michael Croner) - A duo that consists of a toaster and a toast with arms that rides in him. They are sometimes referred to as the "Toast Bros."
 Trevor – A lion-like creature with flower petals surrounding his head.
 Townsperson (voiced by Roger Craig Smith) - An accident-prone citizen who is almost always in a dangerous situation.

Episodes

Season 1 (2017–19)

Season 2 (2019)

Season 3 (2019–20)

Release

Broadcast
The series was released on Cartoon Network on October 1, 2017, after The Lego Ninjago Movie was released in theatres on September 22, 2017. It was also released internationally in the United Kingdom and Ireland on March 5, and on Teletoon in Canada on March 17, 2018. It premiered on Cartoon Network channels in Southeast Asia on March 30, in Sub-Saharan Africa on April 9 and in Australia and New Zealand on April 27, 2018. It premiered on France 4 in France on September 3, 2018.

Home media
The first DVD set of the series was released on August 28, 2018, subtitled "Sparkle Party Season 1, Part 1".

The entire first season was released on DVD on May 7, 2019.

The show is streaming on Hulu in the United States

Sets

2018 sets 

The first and only sets released in the United States in August 2018 and including promotional sets.

Unikitty! Blind Bags Series 1 

There are 12 completed blind bags sets.

Reception
A favorable review of the series came from Emily Ashby from Common Sense Media where she notes Unikitty's motivations can inspire good, her friends yield in teamwork and are willing to accept reality whenever everything doesn't go as planned. Upon the release of the "Sparkle Party" DVD, Luke Y. Thompson from Forbes gave a positive review of Unikitty!, stating that the series "has humor for everyone", although its "occasional dark bit of subtext" could go against the taste of some parents for their children.

Accolades

See also

The Lego Movie (franchise)
The Lego Movie
The Lego Movie 2: The Second Part
The Lego Movie (Lego theme)
Lego Unikitty!
The Lego Movie Videogame
The Lego Movie 2 Videogame
Lego Dimensions

Notes

References

External links
 
 

2010s American animated television series
2020s American animated television series
2010s American children's comedy television series
2020s American children's comedy television series
2017 American television series debuts
2017 animated television series debuts
2020 American television series endings
Anime-influenced Western animated television series
American children's animated action television series
American children's animated adventure television series
American children's animated comedy television series
American children's animated fantasy television series
American children's animated musical television series
American flash animated television series
Animated television shows based on films
Animated television series about cats
Animated television series about children
American animated television spin-offs
Television series about royalty
Television shows based on toys
Television series about princesses
Fiction about unicorns
Cartoon Network original programming
English-language television shows
Lego television series
Television series by Warner Bros. Animation
The Lego Movie (franchise)